The 2012 Baku Cup was a professional tennis tournament played on hard courts. This was the second edition of the tournament, which was part of the 2012 WTA Tour. It took place in Baku, Azerbaijan between 23 and 29 July 2012.

Singles main-draw entrants

Seeds

 1 Rankings are as of July 16, 2012

Other entrants
The following players received wildcards into the singles main draw:
  Kamilla Farhad
  Varvara Flink
  Ekaterine Gorgodze

The following players received entry from the qualifying draw:
  Sacha Jones
  Aleksandra Krunić
  Valeria Solovieva
  Wang Qiang

Withdrawals
  Tímea Babos
  Kateryna Bondarenko
  Alizé Cornet
  Olga Govortsova (viral illness)
  Anna Tatishvili

Retirements
  Estrella Cabeza Candela (abdominal strain)
  Noppawan Lertcheewakarn (right elbow injury)
  Ksenia Pervak (heat illness)

Doubles main-draw entrants

Seeds

1 Rankings are as of July 16, 2012

Other entrants
The following pairs received wildcards into the doubles main draw:
  Kamilla Farhad /  Oleksandra Korashvili
  Varvara Flink /  Patricia Mayr-Achleitner

Retirements
  Estrella Cabeza Candela (abdominal strain)
  Noppawan Lertcheewakarn (right elbow injury)

Champions

Singles

 Bojana Jovanovski def.  Julia Cohen, 6–3, 6–1

Doubles

 Irina Buryachok /  Valeria Solovieva def.  Eva Birnerová /  Alberta Brianti, 6–3, 6–2

External links
Official Website

Baku Cup
Baku Cup
2012 in Azerbaijani sport